The Philippine game show Everybody, Sing! has aired 76 episodes since its premiere from June 5, 2021.

On August 14 and 15, 2021, the program aired replays due to the implementation of enhanced community quarantine in Metro Manila.

From September 25 to October 10, 2021, the program aired special episodes dubbed as "100 Songbayanan Special" which were shot before the COVID-19 pandemic and the ABS-CBN shutdown. These special episodes featured the program's original format with 100 players, 10 rounds and a P2 jackpot million prize.

Episodes overview 
Legend

Season 1

Season 2

Episodes list 
Legend

Season 1

Season 2

Footnotes

References 

Philippine game shows